"Sehnsucht" ("Longing" or "Yearning") is an art song for voice and piano composed by Richard Strauss in 1896, setting a poem of the same title by the German poet Detlev von Liliencron (1844–1909). It is the second song in his collection Five songs for voice and piano, Op. 32, TrV 174.

Composition history

Liliencron was twenty years older than Strauss, his father an impecunious Baron and his mother an American general's daughter, who for much of his life was in the Prussian army including active service in two wars.  He was an influence on poets such as Otto Bierbaum and Rainer Maria Rilke and also the composer Hugo Wolf. Strauss was to set four songs by him, "Sehnsucht" being the first. It was composed over 2 days in January 1896 and was published in a set of five songs. Jefferson writes that "The lied is notable for the basic two-bar phrase in the piano part - really, a notable stroke, this - and of course the marvellously successful suspension, so unexpected, yet so right". Norman Del Mar wrote that: Sehnsucht is remarkable for its complete change of mood midway in the poem and this, with its implicit musical possibilities, clearly fascinated Strauss. The lonely wanderer on the barren heath becomes obsessed with thoughts of his beloved to the point of seeing her hallucinatory image, cold in manner at first, but touched by his repeated declarations of love, ultimately with laughing, shining eyes. Strauss paints the bleak scene with an extended series of arpeggiando discords which resolve with increasingly Tristanesque poignancy.  At long last, the yearning of the song's title evokes the actual image of the beloved... There is a passionate climax amidst the last repitions of the words Ich liebe dich (I love you). But towards the end, the desolation returns, giving the impression of a lover reawakening to an unwelcome awareness of his surroundings.  In the last two bars, however, he has a last fleeting vision of his beloved.  

The song was premiered at Munich on 9 November 1896, along with the four other Opus 32 songs, with Strauss accompanying Raoul Walter, a lyric tenor who was resident at the Munich Royal Opera. Strauss recorded the song in 1943 for a radio broadcast from Vienna, with himself on piano with tenor Anton Dermota.

The poem has been set by several other composers, the best known being a version by Pfitzner in 1900.

Lyrics

The poem comes from Liliencron's 1890 collection Der Haidegänger (English The Heath Walker)

References
Notes

Sources

 Norman Del Mar, Richard Strauss. A Critical Commentary on his Life and Works, Volume 3, London: Faber and Faber (2009)[1968] (second edition), .
 Getz, Christine (1991), The Lieder of Richard Strauss, chapter 10 in Mark-Daniel Schmid, Richard Strauss Companion, Praeger Publishers, Westfield CT, 2003, .
 Jefferson, Alan. (1971) The Lieder of Richard Straus, Cassel and Company, London.  
 Schuh, W. Richard Strauss: A Chronicle of the Early Years 1864-1898, (translated by Mary Wittal), Cambridge University Press, 1982. .
 Trenner, Franz (2003) Richard Strauss Chronik, Verlag Dr Richard Strauss Gmbh, Wien, .

Songs by Richard Strauss
1896 songs